Eccoptochiloides is a genus of trilobites in the order Phacopida, that existed during the upper Ordovician in what is now the Czech Republic. It was described by Prantl and Pribyl in 1947, and the type species is Eccoptochiloides tumescens, which was originally described under the genus Cheirurus by Barrande in 1852. The type locality was the Vinice Formation.

References

External links
 Eccoptochiloides at the Paleobiology Database

Phacopida genera
Fossil taxa described in 1947
Ordovician trilobites
Fossils of the Czech Republic
Cheiruridae